Somerville (2001 pop.: 368) is a Canadian rural community in Carleton County, New Brunswick.

Somerville is located on Route 103 between Wakefield and Hartland. The Hartland Bridge, the longest covered bridge in the world, crosses the Saint John River between Hartland and Somerville.

History

Notable people

See also
List of communities in New Brunswick

References

Communities in Carleton County, New Brunswick
Designated places in New Brunswick